Karakachanov is a Bulgarian family name related to the Sarakatsani. It may refer to:

 Aleksandar Karakachanov, Green Party of Bulgaria leader, former mayor of Sofia
 Krasimir Karakachanov, Bulgarian politician, leader of the VMRO-BND party, Minister of Defense and Deputy prime minister

Bulgarian-language surnames